Chromodoris africana, or four-coloured nudibranch, is a species of colourful sea slug, a dorid nudibranch, a marine gastropod mollusc in the family Chromodorididae.

Distribution
This species is known from the Red Sea and the western Indian Ocean to the southern KwaZulu-Natal coast of South Africa. It is found down to 30m.

It's also been found in Pacific at Philippines.

Description
This species may grow to 75mm in total length. It is a smooth-bodied nudibranch, with a black ground colour, two white lines running down the notum, which has a white rim, and an orange margin. The gills and rhinophores are yellow to orange.

Ecology
C. africana feeds on sponges. It is known to eat a species of the sponge genus Negombata.

References

Chromodorididae
Gastropods described in 1904